Mateusz Kostrzewski (born 18 September 1989) is a Polish professional basketball player who last played for Wilki Morskie Szczecin of the PLK.

Professional career
After many years as a successful player in Poland’s youth divisions, Kostrzewski started his professional career for the division 3 team OSSM PZKosz Sopot where he gained experience and played for Gdynia’s junior team as well. In 2008 he had his first games for Gdynia’s senior team and played his first Euroleague game in 2010. Between 2008 and 2010, he gained further experience at Gdynia’s 2nd and 3rd team as well as its youth teams.

In the 2018–19 season, he won the Polish Basketball Cup with Stal Ostrów Wielkopolski and was named the tournament's Most Valuable Player. The following season, he averaged 13.1 points and 5.6 rebounds per game. On June 6, 2020, he extended his contract for an additional season.

On July 26, 2021, he has signed with Start Lublin of the PLK.

Achievements

Individual
 2008: Polish U20 Championships All-Tournament 1st Team
 2007: Poland national under-18 basketball team
 2008, 2009: Poland national under-20 basketball team
 2010: Poland national basketball team
 2019: Polish Cup MVP

With the club
 2008: Polish U20 Championships Finalist
 2009: Polish Cup Finalist
 2019: Polish Cup winner
 2009, 2010, 2015: Polish League Champion
 2010: Euroleague Quarterfinals

References

External links
 Mateusz Kostrzewski at euroleague.net

1989 births
Living people
People from Elbląg
Polish men's basketball players
Small forwards
Sportspeople from Warmian-Masurian Voivodeship
Stal Ostrów Wielkopolski players
Start Lublin players
Turów Zgorzelec players